Stannern meteorite fell on May 22, 1808 into the Moravian village Stonařov (in German Stannern), in today's Czech Republic.

Classification
The meteorites were classified into the HED meteorite clan (possibly from asteroid 4 Vesta) and eucrite sub-group.

The fall
The fall was witnessed by many and dozens of fragments were soon collected by naturalist Karl Schreibers.

The meteorite shower occurred on Sunday 22 May 1808, shortly before 06:00. The event was witnessed by people on their way into the church. According to the local chronicle the fall took about 8 minutes and the number of meteorites was estimated to 200–300. No person was injured and no property was damaged. 

Shortly after the fall Dr. Karl Schreibers, director of natural science collections in Vienna, arrived to the place, organized search for the fragments and thoroughly documented the event.

Sample distribution
The stones found their way into museums all over the world. The largest fragment is stored in the Museum of Natural History in Vienna.

Literature 
 Journal of Natural Philosophy, Chemistry and the Arts, volume XXV, 1810, published by William Nicholson: Analysis of the aerolite that fell on Stannern, Moravia, article by Louis Nicolas Vauquelin, p. 54-59. Google books scan
 For the 200th anniversary of the event Museum of Vysočina Region in Jihlava published proceedings about the Stonařov meteorite. The document contains, among others, contemporary records and complete list of places keeping the fragments.

See also
 Glossary of meteoritics

References

External links
 Composition of the meteorite
 Short information about the event (in Czech, website of Czech Academy of Sciences)
 List of the most known meteorites on area of the Czech Republic (in Czech)
 Our Favorite Achondrites, Part 1 by the IMCA Board of Directors
 Photo of one of the fragments

Meteorites found in the Czech Republic
Jihlava District
1808 in Europe
1808 in science
Asteroidal achondrites